Koelewijn is a Dutch surname. The name translates to "cool wine" in English, but it originated as koele wei, meaning "cool whey", a metonymic reference to a dairy farmer. Among variant forms are Collewijn, Koldewijn, Kollewijn, Koldeweij and Koldewey. People with the name include: 

Job Koelewijn (born 1962), Dutch contemporary artist
Peter Koelewijn (born 1940), Dutch singer, songwriter, music manager and record producer 
Thomas Koelewijn (born 1988), Dutch volleyball player
 Kollewijn
 (1857–1942), Dutch linguist who proposed spelling reforms that have been implemented both in Dutch and Afrikaans

References

Dutch-language surnames
Occupational surnames